The Kuki people are an ethnic group native to the Mizo Hills (formerly Lushai), a mountainous region in the southeastern part of Mizoram and Manipur in India.  The Kuki constitute one of several hill tribes within India, Bangladesh, and Myanmar. In Northeast India, they are present in all states except Arunachal Pradesh.

Some fifty tribes of Kuki peoples in India are recognised as scheduled tribes, based on the dialect spoken by that particular Kuki community as well as their region of origin.

The Chin people of Myanmar and the Mizo people of Mizoram are kindred tribes of the Kukis. Collectively, they are termed the Zo people.

History

Early history
The early history of the Kukis is obscure. The origin of the word "Kuki" is uncertain; it is an exonym: it was not originally as a self-designation by the tribes that are now called Kukis. According to the colonial British writer Adam Scott Reid, the earliest reference to the word Kuki can be dated to 1777 CE, when it first appeared in British records. Ancient Sanskrit legendary literature mentions the Kirata people, which have been identified with tribes such as the Kuki.

According to CA Soppit, with respect to Manipur, the "Old Kukis" were first heard of in 16th century, while the "New Kukis" migrated to Manipur only during the first half of the 19th century. W. McCullough in his account published in 1859 as well as R. B. Pemberton in his Report on Eastern Frontier published in 1835 also suggest large migration of Kukis in Manipur at the start of 19th Century.

On 31 January 1860, Kuki Riang led the Kukis of Hill Tippera in raiding the Chhagalnaiya plains (then under the administration of the Twipra Kingdom) which was inhabited by ethnic Bengalis and British officers. The Kukis looted the area of Bakhshganj and murdered Kamal Poddar of Basantpur. They then proceeded to molest Poddar's women until Guna Ghazi and Jakimal waged war against them in the village of Kulapara. Whilst the Kukis abducted 700 women, Munshi Abdul Ali informed the British authorities of the atrocities. 185 Britons were assassinated, 100 of them were kidnapped and the Kukis remained in the plains for one or two days. British troops and policemen were finally despatched from Noakhali, Tipperah (Comilla) and Chittagong to suppress them but the Kukis had already fled to the jungles of the princely state and they never returned to Chhagalnaiya ever again.

Contact with Christian missionaries and resistance
Long ignored by Europe, an important landmark in the history of the Kuki people was the arrival of missionaries and the spread of Christianity among them. Missionary activity had considerable social, cultural and political ramifications while the acceptance of Christianity marked a departure from the tradition religion of the Kuki peoples as well as both the Kuki peoples' ancestral customs and traditions. The spread of English education introduced the Kuki people to the "modern era". William Pettigrew, the first foreign missionary, came to Manipur on 6 February 1894 and was sponsored by the American Baptist Mission Union. He, together with Dr. Crozier, worked together in the North and the Northeast of Manipur. In the south, Watkins Robert of the Welsh Presbytery mission organised the Indo-Burma Thadou-Kuki Pioneer Mission in 1913. To have a broader scope, the mission's name was changed to North East India General Mission (NEIGM).

The first resistance to British hegemony by the Kuki people was the Kuki Rebellion of 1917–19 after which their territory was subjugated by the British and divided between the administrations of British India and British Burma. Up until their defeat in 1919, the Kukis had been an independent people ruled by their chieftains. The Dobashi, Lengjang Kuki was credited as responsible for preventing the Kukis of the Naga Hills from joining the Kuki Rebellion of Manipur.

During World War II, seeing an opportunity to regain independence, the Kuki fought with the Imperial Japanese Army and the Indian National Army led by Subhas Chandra Bose but the success of the Allied forces over the Axis group dashed their hopes.

Cultures and traditions

The land of the Kukis has a number of customs and traditions.

Sawm
Sawm, a community centre for boys – was the centre of learning in which the Sawm-upa (an elder) did the teaching, while Sawm-nu took care of chores, such as combing of the boy's hair, washing of the garments and making the beds. The best students were recommended to the King's or the Chief's service, and eventually would achieve the office of Semang and Pachong (ministers) in their courts, or gal –lamkai (leaders, warriors) in the army.

Lawm
Lawm (a traditional type of youth club) was an institution in which boys and girls engaged in social activities for the benefit of the individual and the community. It was also another learning institution. Every Lawm has a Lawm-upa (a senior member), a To’llai-pao (an overseer or superintendent) and a Lawm-tangvo (assistant superintendent). Besides being a source of traditional learning, the institution of the Lawm also facilitated the transmission of both technical as well as practical knowledge to its members, especially with regard to particular methods of farming, hunting, fishing and sporting activities such as Kung–Kal (high jump, especially over a choice mithun), Ka’ng Ka’p, Ka’ngchoi Ka’p (top game), Suhtumkhawh (javelin throw using the heavy wooden implement for pounding-de-husking-paddy) and So’ngse (shot put).

The Lawm was also a centre where young Kuki people learned discipline and social etiquette. After harvest season, the Lawm meet is celebrated with a Lawm-se’l and, as a commemoration, a pillar is erected. The event is accompanied by dance and drinking rice-beer, which sometimes continues for days and nights.

Laws and government

Governance
With regard to governance, Semang (cabinet) is the annual assembly of a Kuki village community held at the Chief's residence represents the Inpi (Assembly). In such an assembly, the Chief and his Semang and Pachong (cabinet members and auxiliary of Inpi) and all the household heads of the village congregate to discuss and resolve matters relating to the village and the community.

Religions
The Bnei Menashe are made up of Mizo, Kuki and Chin peoples, who all speak Tibeto-Burman languages, and whose ancestors migrated into northeast India from Burma mostly in the 17th and 18th centuries. They are called Chin in Burma. In the late 20th century, an Israeli rabbi investigating their claims named them Bnei Menashe, based on their account of descent from Menasseh. Most of the peoples in these two northeast states, who number more than 3.7 million, do not identify with these claims. Some have supported other movements to separate from India.

Prior to conversion in the 19th century to Christianity by Welsh Baptist missionaries, the Chin, Kuki, and Mizo peoples were animists; among their practices were ritual headhunting. Since the late 20th century, some of these peoples have begun following Messianic Judaism. The Bnei Menashe are a small group who started studying and practicing Judaism since the 1970s in a desire to return to what they believe is the religion of ancestors. The Bnei Menashe number below 9,000; several thousand have emigrated to Israel.

The majority of Kukis are now Christians, with most belonging to Protestant denominations, especially Baptist.

Due to the close proximity to Muslim-majority Bengal, a Kuki Muslim community has also developed. They are said to be descendants of Kuki men who had married Bengali Muslim women, a relationship requiring the husband to be a Muslim. They are mostly centred around the village of North Chandrapur in the Tripuri city of Udaipur. Notable Kuki Muslims include Khirod Ali Sardar of Chandrapur and Ali Mia of Sonamura. The community has been subject to scorn by other Kukis.

See also
 Zale'n-gam

References

External links

Ethnic groups in Bangladesh
Ethnic groups in Manipur
Ethnic groups in Tripura
Ethnic groups in Myanmar
Tribes of Assam
Kuki tribes
Headhunting
Scheduled Tribes of Nagaland
Scheduled Tribes of Assam
Scheduled Tribes of Mizoram
Scheduled Tribes of Meghalaya
Ethnic groups in Northeast India
Ethnic groups in South Asia